CppDepend is a static analysis tool for C/C++ code. This tool supports a large number of code metrics, allows for visualization of dependencies using directed graphs and dependency matrix. The tools also performs code base snapshots comparison, and validation of architectural and quality rules. User-defined rules can be written using LINQ queries. This possibility is named CQLinq. The tool also comes with a large number of predefined CQLinq code rules.

Features
The main features of CppDepend are:

 Hundred of Clang diagnostics
 Support for C++14
 Declarative code rule over LINQ query (CQLinq)
 Dependency Visualization (using dependency graphs, and dependency matrix)
 Software metrics (CppDepend currently supports 82 code metrics: Cyclomatic complexity; Afferent and Efferent Coupling; Relational Cohesion; Percentage of code covered by tests, etc.)
 CppDepend can tell you what has been changed between 2 builds
New features in v2017.1
 Support for Visual Studio 2017
 Enhanced Visual Studio Integration
 Smart Technical Debt Estimation
 Quality Gates
 Better Issues Management
 Dashboard Improvements
 Default Rules-Set Improvements
 Enhanced Baseline Experience
 Report Improvements
 Code Query Improvements

Code Rule through LINQ Query (CQLinq)

The tool proposes live code query and code rule through LINQ query.
This is one of the innovations of CppDepend. For example:

- Classes inherit from a particular class:

 // classes inherit from a particular class
 from t in Types
 where t.IsClass && t.DeriveFrom ("CBase")
 select t

- The 10 most complex methods (Source Code Cyclomatic complexity)

 // The 10 most complex methods
 (from m in Methods
 orderby m.CyclomaticComplexity
 select new { m, m.CyclomaticComplexity }).Take(10)

In addition, the tool proposes a live CQLinq query editor with code completion and embedded documentation.

See also
 Sourcetrail Free Open-Source source code explorer that provide interactive dependency graphs.
 Design Structure Matrix
 Software visualization

References

External links
The CppDepend web-site
Dr.Dobb's Review
InfoQ Review
isocpp News
heise.de Review
CppDepend Blog
PCWorld Reviews
LLVM review
CodeGuru Review

Static program analysis tools
Software metrics